Alan Oakley may refer to:
 Alan Oakley (journalist)
 Alan Oakley (designer)

See also
 Allan Oakley, Australian rules footballer